The Fondation Suisse de Déminage is a Swiss non-governmental organisation specialised in humanitarian demining and the clearance of environmental hazards. It was formerly known as the Fédération Suisse de Déminage.

In 2005,  was created, a totally independent entity based in France; however, it is an affiliated entity of FSD. In 2007, Crosstech S.A. was created, which is a commercial subsidiary of, and fully owned by, FSD in Switzerland.

The organisation has been certified with the ZEWO label since 2003.

History

FSD was originally founded in 1997 in Geneva under the name "Fédération suisse de déminage" by Michel Diot, Henri Leu, Hansjörg Eberle, Bertrand Cottet, Beat Aebi, Claude Aerni, Rudolf Jäckli. Between 1998 and 2002, FSD launched its first mine action projects, chronologically in the following countries: Bosnia-Herzegovina, Croatia, Kosovo, Pakistan, Albania, Afghanistan, Lebanon and Sri Lanka. In 2003, the “Fédération Suisse de déminage” became the "Fondation Suisse de déminage” (Swiss Foundation for Mine Action), chaired by Henri Leu and directed by Hansjörg Eberle. In 2005, FSD was joined by a fully independent sister entity called "Association franco-suisse de déminage", now renamed Association FSD France. In 2007, the company Crosstech S.A. was created. This is a commercial subsidiary fully owned by FSD.

Missions

Initially, FSD’s activities were only focused on mine action : the localisation and destruction of mines and unexploded ordnance; mine risk education; ordnance and stockpile management; and assisting victims of accidental explosions.
Over the years, FSD has widened its field of action. Two new types of programmes were established: decontamination of sites polluted by toxic waste and post conflict recovery and stability in countries where FSD is based to contribute to working across the humanitarian, development and peace and security sectors. 
At the same time, FSD is involved in research projects aimed at using new technologies in mine action.

See also
Ottawa Treaty (Mine Ban Treaty)
Mine clearance agencies
Demining

References

Mine warfare and mine clearance organizations
Organisations based in Geneva
Foundations based in Switzerland